Shivor is a rural locality (a selo) in Chankovsky Selsoviet, Botlikhsky District, Republic of Dagestan, Russia. The population was 85 as of 2010.

Geography 
Shivor is located 18 km northeast of Botlikh (the district's administrative centre) by road. Chanko is the nearest rural locality.

References 

Rural localities in Botlikhsky District